The following outline is provided as an overview of and topical guide to Geneva:

Geneva –

General reference 
 Pronunciation: ;  ;  ;  ;  ; ;
 Common English name(s): Geneva
 Official English name(s): Geneva
 Adjectival(s): Genevan, Genevese
 Demonym(s): Genevan, Genevese

Geography of Geneva 

Geography of Geneva
 Geneva is:
 a city
 capital of the Canton of Geneva
 Population of Geneva: 198,979
 Area of Geneva: 15.92 km2 (6.15 sq mi)
 Atlas of Geneva

Location of Geneva 

 Geneva is situated within the following regions:
 Northern Hemisphere and Eastern Hemisphere
 Eurasia
 Europe (outline)
 Central Europe
 Switzerland (outline)
 Canton of Geneva
 Grand Genève
 Time zone(s): 
 Central European Time (UTC+01)
 In Summer (DST): Central European Summer Time (UTC+02)

Environment of Geneva 

 Climate of Geneva

Natural geographic features of Geneva 

 Islands in Geneva
 Île Rousseau
 Lakes in Geneva
 Lake Geneva
 Rivers in Geneva
 Arve
 Rhône
  Rocks in Geneva
 Pierres du Niton

Areas of Geneva

Districts of Geneva 

 Servette

Neighborhoods in Geneva 

 Champel
 Plainpalais

Locations in Geneva 

 Tourist attractions in Geneva
 Museums in Geneva
 Shopping areas and markets
 World Heritage Sites in Geneva

Bridges in Geneva 

 Hans Wilsdorf Bridge

Cultural and exhibition centres in Geneva 

 Centre d'Art Contemporain Genève
 Palexpo

Fountains in Geneva 

 Jet d'Eau

Monuments and memorials in Geneva 

 Brunswick Monument
 Celestial Sphere Woodrow Wilson Memorial
 Reformation Wall

Museums and art galleries in Geneva 

Museums in Geneva
 Barbier-Mueller Museum
 Institut et Musée Voltaire
 International Red Cross and Red Crescent Museum
 MAMCO
 Musée Ariana
 Musée d'Art et d'Histoire
 Musée d'ethnographie de Genève
 Musée d'histoire des sciences
 Musée Rath
 Natural History Museum

Palaces and villas in Geneva 

 Les Délices
 Palais Wilson

Parks and gardens in Geneva 

 Conservatory and Botanical Garden of the City of Geneva
 Jardin Anglais
 L'horloge fleurie
 Parc des Eaux Vives
 Parc La Grange

Public squares in Geneva 

 Place du Bourg-de-Four

Religious buildings in Geneva 

 Basilica of Our Lady of Geneva
 Calvin Auditory
 Evangelical Free Church of Geneva
 Russian Church
 St. Pierre Cathedral

Secular buildings in Geneva 

 Bâtiment des Forces motrices
 Centre William Rappard
 Immeuble Clarté
 Maison de la paix
 Palace of Nations
 RHINO

Streets in Geneva 

 Quai Gustave-Ador
 Port-Noir
 Rue de Berne

Theatres in Geneva 

 Grand Théâtre de Genève
 Théâtre de Neuve

Demographics of Geneva 

Demographics of Geneva

Government and politics of Geneva 

Politics of Geneva
 Mayors of Geneva

International organizations based in Geneva 
 International organizations based in Geneva
 International Committee of the Red Cross
 International Organization for Standardization
 International Telecommunication Union
 United Nations Office at Geneva
 World Intellectual Property Organization

Law and order in Geneva 
 Crime in Geneva

History of Geneva

History of Geneva

History of Geneva, by period or event 

Timeline of Geneva
 Beginnings and early Middle Ages
 Geneva first appears in history as an Allobrogian border town.
 Geneva during the 18th century
 Geneva during the 19th century
 Geneva flourished in the 19th and 20th centuries, becoming the seat of many international organizations.
 Geneva during the 20th century

History of Geneva, by subject 
 L'Escalade
 Geneva Revolution of 1782

Culture of Geneva 
 

Culture of Geneva

Arts in Geneva

Architecture of Geneva 

 Cultural property of national significance in Switzerland: Geneva

Cinema of Geneva 
 Geneva International Film Festival

Music of Geneva 

 Music festivals and competitions in Geneva
 Geneva International Music Competition
 Music schools in Geneva
 Conservatoire de Musique de Genève 
 Geneva University of Music
 Music venues in Geneva
 Victoria Hall
 Musical ensembles in Geneva
 Ensemble Contrechamps
 Geneva Camerata
 Orchestre de chambre de Genève
 Orchestre de la Suisse Romande
 Musicians from Geneva
 Frank Martin

Theatre of Geneva

Visual arts of Geneva 

Public art in Geneva
 Celestial Sphere Woodrow Wilson Memorial

Events in Geneva

 Fêtes de Genève
 Geneva Motor Show

Languages of Geneva
 French language
 Franco-Provençal language

Media in Geneva
 Newspapers in Geneva
Le Courrier
Le Temps
Tribune de Genève
 Radio and television in Geneva
 Radio Télévision Suisse

People from Geneva
 Pierre Prévost
 Jean-Jacques Rousseau
 Émile Taddéoli

Traditions and customs in Geneva
 Jeûne genevois
 L'Escalade

Religion in Geneva 

Religion in Geneva
 Catholicism in Geneva
Roman Catholic Diocese of Lausanne, Geneva and Fribourg
 Islam in Geneva
 Geneva Mosque
 Judaism in Geneva
 Hekhal Haness Synagogue

Sports in Geneva 

Sports in Geneva

 Basketball in Geneva
 Lions de Genève
 Football in Geneva
 Association football in Geneva
Servette FC
 Ice hockey In Geneva
 Genève-Servette HC
 Sports competitions in Geneva
 Geneva Marathon
 Geneva Open
 Geneva Open Challenger
 Sports venues in Geneva
 Patinoire des Vernets
 SEG Geneva Arena
 Stade de Genève

Economy and infrastructure of Geneva 

Economy of Geneva
 Communications in Geneva
 Financial services in Geneva
 Bank Lombard Odier & Co
 CIM Bank
 The Pictet Group
 Hotels in Geneva
 Beau-Rivage Geneva
 Hotel President Wilson
 InterContinental Geneva
 Le Richemond
 Tourism in Geneva

Transportation in Geneva 

Transportation in Geneva
 Public transport operators in Geneva
 Geneva Public Transport
 Air transport in Geneva
 Airports in Geneva
Geneva Airport
 Maritime transport in Geneva 
 Mouettes Genevoises Navigation
 Road transport in Geneva
 Bus transport in Geneva
TOSA Flash Mobility, Clean City, Smart Bus
 Trolleybuses in Geneva

Rail transport in Geneva 

Rail transport in Geneva

 Railway stations in Geneva
 Genève-Cornavin railway station
 Geneva Airport railway station
 Trams in Geneva

Education in Geneva 

Education in Geneva
 International school in Geneva
 International School of Geneva
 Universities in Geneva
 University of Geneva
 Research institutes in Geneva
 Geneva International Peace Research Institute

Healthcare in Geneva 

 Hospitals in Geneva
 Clinique La Colline
 Geneva University Hospital

See also 

 Outline of geography

References

External links 

Geneva
Geneva